Robert Deane Pharr (1916–1989 or 1992) was an African-American novelist.

Pharr attended Saint Paul's Normal and Industrial School, Lincoln University, Virginia Union University and Fisk University, but spent most of his career working as a waiter. He graduated from Virginia Union University in 1939, and did graduate work at Fisk, Columbia University, and New York University. He described his goal when he started writing as to be a "black Sinclair Lewis". He is best known for his debut novel The Book of Numbers (1969), about the numbers racket, which was adapted into a 1973 film of the same name. A draft of his novel Giveadamn Brown and related correspondence were given to the Archives and Special Collections Department, L. Douglas Wilder Library, at Virginia Union University.

Works

 The Book of Numbers (1969)
 S.R.O. (1971)
 The Welfare Bitch (1973)
 The Soul Murder Case (1975)
 Giveadamn Brown (1978)

References

1916 births
20th-century deaths
Year of death uncertain
African-American novelists
20th-century American novelists
20th-century African-American writers